Point Lumpatang is a beach and cape located in West Tapalang subdistrict, Mamuju Regency, West Sulawesi. The cape is the westernmost point of Sulawesi. The waters around the cape is rich in squids.

References

Lumpatang